Moscho Tzavela (1760–1803) was a Greek heroine of the years before the outbreak of the Greek War of Independence, who has been mentioned in modern Greek literature.

Moscho Tzavela was descendant of a long line of Greek guerilla fighters.

References

1760 births
1803 deaths
Greek revolutionaries
Souliotes
18th-century Greek people
Women in 18th-century warfare
Women in the Greek War of Independence